Solidago plumosa is a rare species of goldenrod known by the common names Yadkin River goldenrod, plumed goldenrod, and plumose goldenrod. It is endemic to North Carolina in the United States, where it grows only on the banks of the Yadkin River. There is only one known population. It is a candidate for federal protection.

This plant is a perennial herb with an erect, ridged, mostly hairless, purple-colored stem up to a meter tall, sometimes growing in tufts. The alternately-arranged leaves are spatula-shaped to linear in shape and measure up to 30 centimeters long. They are smooth-edged or toothed. The inflorescence is a panicle of many flower heads with yellow petals each about half a centimeter long.

This rare plant is known only from a 2.5-mile stretch of the Yadkin River in North Carolina. It grows along the banks in cracks in the mafic bedrock. It can also anchor in concrete at the bases of local dams. It is sometimes subjected to scouring by floodwaters. It may grow alongside other plants, including Virginia pine (Pinus virginiana), winged elm (Ulmus alata), sweet-gum (Liquidambar styraciflua), sparkleberry (Vaccinium arboreum), false indigo (Amorpha fruticosa), little bluestem (Schizachyrium scoparium), orangegrass (Hypericum gentianoides), and white false indigo (Baptisia alba).

The plant grows next to two dams, the Narrows Dam and the Falls Dam. It is likely that these structures alter the normal flow regime of the river enough to constitute a threat to the species. The plant may depend on periodic flooding to scour competing vegetation out of its habitat. The dams prevent or reduce the frequency of these flooding events. Introduced species of plants may threaten the species, particularly mimosa (Albizia julibrissin), which easily takes hold in the local riverbank habitat.

Other threats to the plant include trampling by boaters and fishermen, who commonly use the immediate habitat for river access. Pollution may also occur.

References

plumosa
Flora of North Carolina